Émile Henry Ltd. is a French ceramic ovenware, tableware, and kitchenware manufacturer based in Burgundy, France. It was founded in 1850.

History

1850: Jacques Henry
In 1850, Jacques Henry, a potter, opened a tiny workshop in Marcigny, southern Burgundy. Jugs, pots, casseroles, dishes, and plates were among the many items created on two manual wheels. For firing, two wood-fired kilns were employed.

1882: Paul Henry
After his father died, Paul Henry took over and extended his client base in Paris from 1882 until 1894. The kilns were powered by coal and employed forty employees. The manual wheels were replaced by mechanical wheels that ran on gas. Steam, a symbol of power and freedom, revolutionized the manufacturing process in 1912.

1922: Emile Henry
In 1922, Emile Henry took over the firm. He was born in 1885 and enlisted in the army in 1914.

Metal cookware manufacturers were big rivals, and several potteries were forced to close. Customers in Paris remained loyal and accounted for 40% of total purchases. Fifty workers were employed at this point, and the completed goods were either not glazed for horticulture use or glazed for culinary usage.

1950: Maurice Henry
When Emile died in 1950, Maurice Henry became the company's president at the age of 32. From 1950 to 1975, the production rose dramatically. Horticultural pottery was phased out around 1980 in order to focus only on glazed culinary pottery.

1983: Jacques Henry
After 9 years of running the firm with his father, Maurice, Jacques Henry established new aims:
 to develop products using their 'Ceradon' process 
 to develop their brand name
 to expand the export market. Between 1989 and 1992, the firm increased its manufacturing capacity and built two additional industrial units in Marcigny, Burgundy. 

Emile Henry was awarded the ISO 9001 international quality standard in 2002.

2012: Jean-Baptiste Henry
Jean-Baptiste Henry, Jacques' son, took over the family company.

Notes

External links
 Emile Henry global website
 Emile Henry USA website

Kitchenware brands
Ceramics manufacturers of France
Companies based in Bourgogne-Franche-Comté